Daisy is the nickname of the following people:

 Daisy Ashford (1881–1972), English writer and author of The Young Visiters, when she was nine-years-old
 Daisy Basham (1879–1963), New Zealand radio broadcaster 
 Daisy Dick (born 1972), Bronze medalist for Great Britain in team eventing at the 2008 Summer Olympics in Beijing
 Daisy Lang (born 1972), Bulgarian professional female boxer and former Super Bantamweight and Super Flyweight world champion
 Juliette Gordon Low (1860–1927), founder of Girl Scouts of the USA
 Daisy Lumini (1936–1993), Italian composer, singer and stage actress
 Daisy Makeig-Jones (1881–1945), English pottery designer for Wedgwood best known for her "Fairyland Lustre" series
 Daisy Romualdez, Filipino actress
 Daisy Sylvan (1874–????), Italian film studio owner, producer, director, and actress in the silent film era
 Her Majesty Margrethe II of Denmark (born 1940), Monarch of The Kingdom of Denmark

See also 
 Daisy (disambiguation)
 Daisy (given name), people with the given name

References

Lists of people by nickname